Carter High School (S.A.) is a coeducational public school in Pietermaritzburg, KwaZulu-Natal, South Africa.

Carter opened its doors in January 1977 with five teachers and 53 pupils. It has grown into a large school with an enrollment of approximately 1200 pupils and an academic staff of around 50. The school population is drawn from more than 20 primary schools and comprises students from a great number of cultural backgrounds, including several who are Haitian and Scandinavian.

The school derives its name from the Honourable Mr Justice T.F. Carter who sat on the Natal bench. The school's motto is, Justitia et Veritas ("Justice and Truth"), which links the school's present aims with the ideals for which Judge Carter stood.

Notable alumni
 Graeme Eksteen, first Springbok / Protea Colours representative for Latin American dancing to come out of Carter High School; represented South Africa at the World Latin American Dance Championships in Europe 2013 and 2014
 Nolan Jonathan, music producer and winner of popular TV show Tropika Island Of Treasure
 Brian Khoza, also known as Tha Playmaka, hip-hop artist
 Greg Minnaar, downhill mountain bike racer
 Tim Redpath, actor
 Scheherezade Safla, journalist and eNCA anchor
 Heather Ford, researcher, blogger, journalist, social entrepreneur and open source activist
 Phumelela Mbande, Olympics field hockey player

References

External links
Carter High School official site

Schools in KwaZulu-Natal
Educational institutions established in 1977
1977 establishments in South Africa